Callan Rydz ( born 3 July 1998, from Newcastle upon Tyne) is a professional English darts player who plays in the Professional Darts Corporation events.

Darts career
At 2018 PDC Q-School he tried to win a tour card, however he missed out on the points table by virtue of countback. He played on the Challenge Tour and Development Tour throughout the year. As a result of his Development Tour exploits, he qualified for the 2018 PDC World Youth Championship and progressed through the early group stage. He managed to reach the semi finals, including a victory over the #1 seed Luke Humphries but lost out 6–3 to eventual runner up Martin Schindler. He also tried to win a  tour card in 2019 Q-School. He came in 10th place but didn't succeed due to countback. Rydz played extremely well hitting 39 180's in only 105 legs, a higher rate than Michael van Gerwen, Gary Anderson  and Dave Chisnall in 2018.

Rydz qualified for the 2019 UK Open by winning through the amateur qualifier in Wolverhampton, but lost to Jamie Hughes in the first round.

On 21 April 2019 he won his first PDC title after picking up the eighth Development Tour title of 2019, beating Luke Humphries 5–2 in the final.

At the 17th Players Championship event of 2019, Rydz made his first Pro Tour appearance in 2 years, and marked it with a run to the quarter finals. He defeated Stephen Burton, Chris Dobey, Steve Beaton and Brendan Dolan before losing 6–3 to eventual winner James Wade.

He followed up the Development Tour title with a Challenge Tour title on 11 August 2019 by seeing off David Evans 5–2 in the final. Rydz went to the top of the Challenge Tour Order of Merit on 28 September 2019 by winning Event 18, beating Cody Harris to win the title.

Rydz finished 2019 top of the Challenge Tour Order of Merit, meaning he gained a two-year PDC Tour Card and qualified for the 2020 PDC World Darts Championship.

He made the quarter-finals of the 2019 PDC World Youth Championship on 4 November, but lost 6–2 to Adam Gawlas.

Rydz won his first Pro Tour title on 26 February 2021, winning the second event of the 2021 PDC Pro Tour, beating Jonny Clayton 8–7 in the final.

Rydz qualified for the 2021 World Matchplay, and on his debut he reached the quarter-finals, overcoming Glen Durrant 10–6, Rob Cross 11–8, before losing to Krzysztof Ratajski 16–8.

Personal life 
Rydz is the cousin of fellow PDC professional player Chris Dobey. He is a supporter of Newcastle United F.C..

World Championship results

PDC
 2020: Second round (lost to Danny Noppert 2–3)
 2021: Second round (lost to James Wade 0–3)
 2022: Quarter-finals (lost to Peter Wright 4–5)
 2023: Second round (lost to Josh Rock 0–3)

Performance timeline
BDO

PDC

PDC European Tour

(W) Won; (F) finalist; (SF) semifinalist; (QF) quarterfinalist; (#R) rounds 6, 5, 4, 3, 2, 1; (RR) round-robin stage; (Prel.) Preliminary round; (DNQ) Did not qualify; (DNP) Did not participate; (NH) Not held; (EX) Excluded; (WD) Withdrew

References

External links

1998 births
Living people
English darts players
Sportspeople from Newcastle upon Tyne
Professional Darts Corporation current tour card holders